Arthur Mannering Tyndall, CBE, FRS, LLD (18 September 1881 – 29 October 1961) was an English physicist from Bristol, England.His teaching activities included lecturing in atomic physics at the University of Bristol. Among his notable students was Paul Dirac, who he introduced to the laws of quantum theory. The university's other early staff included John Edward Lennard-Jones, Beryl May Dent, Herbert Wakefield Banks Skinner and William Sucksmith.

References

1881 births
1961 deaths
Fellows of the Royal Society
Academics of the University of Bristol
20th-century British physicists
Scientists from Bristol
Academics of University College Bristol